Patrick Henry Grace (1832 – February 24, 1896) was a United States Navy sailor who received the Medal of Honor for actions during the Korean Expedition of 1871.

A native of Ireland whose name originally was Henry Patrick Grace, Grace was cited for "gallant and meritorious conduct".

Medal of Honor citation
Rank and organization: Chief Quartermaster, U.S. Navy. Born: 1835. Ireland. Accredited to: Pennsylvania. G.O. No. 177, December 4, 1915.

Citation:

On board the U.S.S. Benicia during the attack on the Korean forts, 10 and 11 June 1871. Carrying out his duties with coolness, Grace set forth gallant and meritorious conduct throughout this action.

See also
List of Medal of Honor recipients

References

 

1832 births
1896 deaths
19th-century Irish people
Irish sailors in the United States Navy
United States Navy sailors
Irish emigrants to the United States (before 1923)
United States Navy Medal of Honor recipients
Irish-born Medal of Honor recipients
Place of death unknown
Date of birth unknown
Korean Expedition (1871) recipients of the Medal of Honor
Burials at Holyhood Cemetery (Brookline)